This is a list of people (real or fictional) appearing on the cover of Rolling Stone magazine in the 1960s. This list is for the regular biweekly issues of the magazine and does not include special issues.

1967

1968

1969

Sources
 Rolling Stone Coverwall 1967–2013
 Rolling Stone: 1,000 Covers: A History of the Most Influential Magazine in Pop Culture, New York, NY: Abrams, 2006. 

Lists of actors
Lists of entertainers
Lists of musicians
1960s